Linn Township is one of the seventeen townships in Cedar County, Iowa, USA.  As of the 2000 census, its population was 201.

History
Linn Township was organized in 1841.

Geography
According to the USGS, it contains two cemeteries: Achey and Mason.

References

External links
 US-Counties.com
 City-Data.com

Townships in Cedar County, Iowa
Townships in Iowa
1841 establishments in Iowa Territory